Inodrillia whitfieldi is an extinct species of sea snail, a marine gastropod mollusk in the family Horaiclavidae.

Description

Distribution
This extinct marine species occurs in Miocene strata of Delaware, USA; age range: 20.43 to 15.97 Ma

References

 G. C. Martin. 1904. Gastropoda. Maryland Geological Survey Miocene(Text):131–269
 J. A. Gardner. 1948. Mollusca from the Miocene and Lower Pliocene of Virginia and North Carolina: Part 2. Scaphopoda and Gastropoda. United States Geological Survey Professional Paper 199(B):179–310
 L. W. Ward. 1998. Mollusks from the Lower Miocene Pollack Farm Site, Kenty County, Delaware: A preliminary analysis. Geology and paleontology of the lower Miocene Pollack Farm Fossil Site, Delaware

External links

whitfieldi